Lieutenant-General William Evans was a British Army General who became governor of the Royal Hospital Chelsea.

Military career
In 1713, during the War of the Spanish Succession, Evans was invited by the Duke of Ormonde to serve in Flanders and acquired a Regiment of Dragoons when Viscount Cobham was stripped of his regiment. The regiment became known as Evans's Dragoons.

He was promoted to lieutenant general in 1727 and in 1728 King George II and Queen Caroline inspected his regiment.

He was also governor of the Royal Hospital Chelsea from 1722 until 1740.

References

 

2nd Dragoon Guards (Queen's Bays) officers
4th Queen's Own Hussars officers
British Army lieutenant generals
British army commanders in the War of the Spanish Succession
18th-century British people
Year of death missing
Year of birth missing